The Impact Assessment Agency of Canada (IAAC) is an agency of the Government of Canada responsible for federal environmental assessment process of major projects. It is part of the Environment and Climate Change Canada portfolio. 

The agency assesses the environmental impacts of major projects in accordance with the Canadian Environmental Assessment Act, 2012 and oversees most federal environmental assessment processes, except for projects regulated by the Canadian Nuclear Safety Commission or the Canada Energy Regulator (CER). The agency encourages public participation, provides administrative and advisory support for review panels, promotes sustainable development, and acts as the Crown Consultation Coordinator to integrate the federal government's Indigenous consultation activities. It is part of the Environment and Climate Change Canada portfolio and reports to the minister of environment and climate change.

History 

The agency was established in 1994 prior to the adoption of the Canadian Environmental Assessment Act in 1995 by the Parliament of Canada. The legislation is the legal basis for the federal environmental assessment process in Canada. On April 26, 2012, the Government introduced Bill C-38, the Jobs, Growth and Long-Term Prosperity Act, a provision of which repealed the Canadian Environmental Assessment Act, replacing it with a new Canadian Environmental Assessment Act, 2012. Bill C-38 received Royal Assent on 29 June 2012 and came into force on 6 July 2012.

The Impact Assessment Agency of Canada was previously known as the Canadian Environmental Assessment Agency. The change in name came into force on August 28, 2019, along with other consequential legislative amendments under an omnibus bill titled An Act to enact the Impact Assessment Act and the Canadian Energy Regulator Act, to amend the Navigation Protection Act and to make consequential amendments to other Acts, which received royal assent on June 21, 2019.

Policy and guidance

Cumulative Effects 

The CEAA defines Cumulative Effects Assessment as "An assessment of the incremental effects of an action on the environment when the effects are combined with those from other past, existing and future actions." "Cumulative effects are changes to the environment that are caused by an action in combination with other past, present and future human actions."

In 1994, the CEAA published A Reference Guide for the Canadian Environmental Assessment Act: Addressing Cumulative Environmental Effects.

CEAA's Operational Policy Statement defines a number of factors to be considered in the environmental assessment of a project that include,

Notes

Citations

References

External links 
Canadian Environmental Assessment Agency 
Canadian Environmental Assessment Act, 2012

Environment of Canada
Federal departments and agencies of Canada
Environmental agencies in Canada
Environmental law in Canada
1994 establishments in Canada